Mary Browne and Elizabeth Ryan were the defending champions, but Browne did not participate. Ryan partnered with Helen Wills, and defeated Bobbie Heine and Irene Peacock in the final, 6–3, 6–2 to win the ladies' doubles tennis title at the 1927 Wimbledon Championships.

Seeds

  Bobbie Heine /  Irene Peacock (final)
  Elizabeth Ryan /  Helen Wills (champions)
  Kitty Godfree /  Betty Nuthall (semifinals)
  Ermyntrude Harvey /  Mary McIlquham (semifinals)

Draw

Finals

Top half

Section 1

The nationality of Mrs DM Evans is unknown.

Section 2

Bottom half

Section 3

The nationality of Mrs JH King is unknown.

Section 4

References

External links

Women's Doubles
Wimbledon Championship by year – Women's doubles
Wimbledon Championships - Doubles
Wimbledon Championships - Doubles